Dysgonomonas gadei  is a Gram-negative and facultatively anaerobic  bacterium from the genus of Dysgonomonas which has been isolated from a gall bladder from a patient in Bergen in Norway.

References

Further reading

External links
 Type strain of Dysgonomonas gadei at BacDive -  the Bacterial Diversity Metadatabase	

Bacteroidia
Bacteria described in 2000